Rehimena cissophora is a moth in the family Crambidae. It is found in Australia, where it has been recorded from Queensland and New South Wales.

References

Moths described in 1908
Spilomelinae